Paul Hertel (born 9 May 1953 in Vienna) is an Austrian composer. He is a recipient of the Theodor Körner-Preis, Staatsstipendium der Republik Österreich, and has an Honorary Degree as the Best Composer of Film Music at the 12th International Fajr Film Festival.

He provided the film score to the film Der gute Ort.

See also
 Music of Austria

References

External links
 Official site

Austrian male composers
Musicians from Vienna
1953 births
Living people